The Dana/Spicer Model 80 is an automotive axle manufactured by Dana Holding Corporation and has been used in OEM heavy duty applications by Chevrolet, Dodge, and Ford. It can be identified by its straight axle tubes, 10 bolt asymmetrical cover, and a "80" cast into the housing. Dana 80's are made as full floating, rear axles only and are step up in overall strength compared to the Dana 70.   1988 Ford was the first company to use the Dana 80. Gross axle weight ratings are lowered by the vehicle manufacturer for safety and tire reasons. The OEM Limited slip differential originally was a "Power Lok" until 1998 when the "Trac Lok" phased it out. Trac Loks were a $350.00 USD option with Ford Super Duty trucks. The Dana 80 Trac Lok is unique being it is a 4 pinion unit, unlike other Dana Trac Lok units with 2 pinions. This was the only rear axle available for the 2nd generation Dodge Ram 3500 trucks.



General specifications
 Ring gear measures .
 4" diameter axle tube.
 Inner axle shaft spline counts are 35 and 37.
 Pinion shaft diameter: 
 Pinion shaft splines: 37
 Axle Shaft diameter
 35 Spline: 
 37 Spline: 
 Gear ratios: 3.23, 3.31, 3.54, 3.73, 4.10, 4.11, 4.30, 4.63, 4.88, 5.13, & 5.38
 Brakes measure 13.39" for 2011 F-350 DRW trucks.
 Brakes measure 15.35" for 2011 F-450 trucks (13,050 GVW).

Usage
Class 3 trucks have been common users of the Dana 80 since it was first manufactured in 1988.  Dodge used the axle selectively in class 2 trucks from 1994-2002.  Ford has made use of the axle in class 4 trucks until 2005 when the Dana S 110 was phased in.

Common applications
Dodge

1994-2002 3500
1994-2002 2500 equipped with manual transmissions and Diesel or V10 engines

Ford

1988-1998 F-350 DRW (Select chassis cabs and pick ups)
1999-2016 F-350 DRW
1988-2004 F-450 
2011-2014 F-450 (13,050 GVW)

GM

1991-2002 C3500 HD
Various heavy duty commercial applications

Source:

References

External links
Specifications 
Parts categories 

Automobile axles
Automotive engineering